Jan van Stolk (March 11, 1920 in Santa Brigida – December 20, 1997 in Oosterbeek) was a Dutch ceramist.

Life and work 
Van Stolk was the son of Pieter Adriaan van Stolk and Sophie van der Does de Willebois. He was born in the Canary Islands and later lived with his parents in Italy, the Netherlands and Greece. In the 1930, he moved back to the Netherlands with his mother and stepfather Luigi de Lerma. They were both potters and started a studio in Utrecht Groenekan. Van Stolk participated in their workshops. During World War II, he studied at the Art Academy in Arnhem under Gijs Jacobs van den Hof.

In 1946, Van Stolk opened his own studios in Nijmegen, and from 1953 in Oosterbeek. Until 1970, he was a lecturer at the Free Academy in Nijmegen. He had several students and assistants, such as Wim Fiege and Marianna Franken. In the early work of Van Stolk the Mediterranean atmosphere is recognizable. Later he was working with engraved decorations, often on a black background. Since the 1960s he also made ceramic sculptures.

See also 
 List of Dutch ceramists

References

External links 
  Jan van Stolk at capriolus.nl

1920 births
1997 deaths
Dutch ceramists
People from Gran Canaria
20th-century ceramists
Dutch expatriates in Spain
Dutch expatriates in Italy
Dutch expatriates in Greece